Once More with Feeling may refer to:

Film and television
 "Once More, with Feeling" (Buffy the Vampire Slayer), a musical episode of the American TV series Buffy the Vampire Slayer
 Once More, with Feeling!, a 1960 film starring Yul Brynner
 Once More with Feeling (film), a 2009 film written and directed by Jeff Lipsky
 One More Time with Feeling, a 2016 documentary about Nick Cave directed by Andrew Dominik

Music

Albums
 Once More with Feeling: Singles 1996–2004, an album by Placebo and compilation DVD
 Once More with Feeling (EP), an EP released in 2000 by Joe Chapman
 Once More with Feeling (Billy Eckstine album), a 1960 album by Billy Eckstine
 Once More, with Feeling (Blood of the Martyrs album), the 2011 debut album by American Christian metal band Blood of the Martyrs
 Once More, with Feeling (Buffy soundtrack), the soundtrack album of the Buffy the Vampire Slayer episode of the same name

Songs
 "Once More with Feeling" (song), a 1970 Jerry Lee Lewis single co-written by Kris Kristofferson and Shel Silverstein
 "Once More with Feeling", a song from Willie Nelson's 1970 album, Both Sides Now
 "Once More (With Feeling)", a 1988 song by Crumbächer from the album Tame the Volcano
 "Once More With Feeling", a song on The Cooper Temple Clause album Make This Your Own
 "Once More with Feeling", a song from Get Cape. Wear Cape. Fly's 2006 album The Chronicles of a Bohemian Teenager

Other uses
 Once More, with Feeling (book), a book by Victoria Coren and Charlie Skelton about making a porn movie